Schjerven is a surname. Notable people with the surname include:

Erik A. Schjerven (born 1980), Norwegian actor
Petter Schjerven (born 1967), Norwegian television host
Rolf Schjerven (1918–1978), Norwegian politician
Torgeir Schjerven (born 1954), Norwegian author and lyric poet